The Reformed Congregational L.M.S. Samoan Church (Ekalesia L.M.S. Toefuataina Samoa) traces its beginnings to the Congregational Christian Church in Samoa (EFKS). It is a group of Congregational Samoan Churches who are adherents of the EFKS Mother Church in Samoa. Because of minor disagreements with doctrine the church had, the founder of the church Rev. Elder Tepa Faleto'ese engaged in forming a newer church that worked to support the spiritual needs of its congregants in a more modern approach. The Reformed Congregational L.M.S Samoan Church share the same doctrines, rules and rituals as the mother church EFKS, however, do not hold the annual Fa'amati, Faiga Me or any other monetary events aside from the Aso Sa o le Talalelei Taulaga. The Church maintains the use of the Samoan Bible and the EFKS Tusi Pese, and its Constitution is similar to that of the EFKS. The Motto of the Church is "Fa'afaigofie, Fa'ataugofie, Fa'asa'oloto" which translates to "Simple, Humble, Free Worship".

The Reformed Congregational L.M.S. Samoan Church name derives from the original name of the first Christian Church of Samoa. The London Missionary Society (L.M.S.), although no longer an active society, has been used by the Church as a name to signify the importance of maintaining its roots traced back to the arrival of the first missionaries to Samoa. It has taken a Reformed Congregationalist approach, and has added to the testimony of the Church and its people.

History 

The Reformed Congregational LMS Samoan Church (Ekalesia LMS Toefuata'iina Samoa) was established and founded by the Rev. Elder Tepa Faleto'ese in Balmain, Sydney Australia in 1992. Faleto'ese was an Elder Minister of the Congregational Christian Church of Samoa (EFKS) and part of the Committee of Elders (Komiti o le 'Au Toea'iina). He served for many years in the EFKS church as Pastor for EFKS Fagaloa (1955), Director of Boys Brigade (1959), PIC Christchurch (1970), EFKS Christchurch (1975), EFKS Aolo'au then moved to Australia in 1980. 

In 1985, Faleto'ese along with others established and founded the first EFKS congregation in Australia (Balmain later renamed Rooty Hill).  As an Elder, he campaigned in the Committee of Elders to effect reforms within the church, to be in line with developing the spiritual rather than the physical side of the church members. As the most influential body that decides on the future of the church, Reverend Faleto'ese said his views were not acceptable to the majority of the Elders.He pushed the main EFKS church to establish itself in Australia, something which materialised in 1985 with himself in the lead. Because of this, Faleto'ese decided to resign from the EFKS Church upon retirement and heeded to establish a new and more contemporary church that catered to the spiritual needs of new migrants arriving from Samoa. The mission was to establish a denomination that focussed on three main principles: Fa'ataugofie, Fa'afaigofie, Fa'asa'oloto

In 1992, Faleto'ese established his new church in Balmain Australia. The establishment of this new congregation paved a way for more congregations to be established across Australia. The second church was founded in Christchurch New Zealand in 1993 with Rev. Tuiataga Siataga. The Church was originally given the name Ekalesia Samoa Tuto'atasi but revoked in 1996, when the Annual General Meeting decided to rename the church Ekalesia LMS Toefuata'iina Samoa (The Reformed LMS Samoan Church).

The LMS Toefuata'iina movement became a trailblazer that saw more than 30 congregations established across Australia and New Zealand. It became one of the fastest growing Christian denominations particularly in Australia and Auckland, New Zealand with over 30,000 worshippers.

Church's Focus  
The Samoan church during the missionary period engaged itself in the "social redemption of humanity". This vision was based on the church's understanding of God's sovereignty. It saw the divine purpose of redemption not in individual terms only but also in corporate, social and political terms. The newly acquired faith had its focus on the transformation of life and society. That legacy remains a motivating force in the nation's idealism as well as in the church's commitment to active social efforts. The church emphasises the idea of "Fa'afaigofie, Fa'ataugofie, Fa'asa'oloto" or "Simple, Humble, Free Worship"

Membership 
In the last census conducted by the Church in 2007, it noted that membership was over 30,000 across Australia, New Zealand and the United States. However, with the controversies and ecumenical splits the church faced, membership of those who remain has dropped significantly to around 2,000.

Early years 

The Reformed Congregational LMS Samoan Church is a world-wide church which is based in Samoa, Australia, New Zealand and the United States of America. In its early years, the newly established church gained members at a very fast momentum which surprised many denominations particularly in Australia and New Zealand. Many think the reasoning behind this 'boom' in numbers was that many families who joined were adherents of the EFKS Church who did not want to bear the burden of financial commitment in the EFKS Church. Many were merely adjusting to new lives in New Zealand and Australia and many were new migrants to new countries.

Diasporic Churches (Sinapi) 

The Diasporic Churches refer to the Parishes that were established in the early years of the LMS Toefuata'iina Movement, between 1992 and 1998. These Churches took on the role to gather, nurture and cater for the spiritual needs of its Samoan communities. The Diasporic Churches are often referred to as the Sinapi (A Samoan figurative plant) that bloomed new congregations. It was from these churches that other Parishes were established, creating a wave of new congregations in both Australia and New Zealand. 
 Balmain, Sydney (Rev. Elder Tepa & Mei Faleto'ese)
 Christchurch, New Zealand (Rev. Elder Tuiataga)
 Brisbane, Australia (Rev. Elder Alapati & Sarai Tu'uga)
 Glen Eden, Auckland (Rev. Edler Litaea & Merita So'oa'emalelagi)
 Mount Druitt, Sydney (Rev. Pepe & Si'ia'e Tiatia)
 Glen Innes, Auckland (Rev. Elder Solomona & Leinati Iosefa)

The Transferral and Missionary Churches (Fua o le Sinapi) 

The Transferral and Missionary churches are Parishes that either formed from the Diasporic Churches or churches that transferred from other denominations such as the EFKS, Methodist, Presbyterian, AOG etc. All of these churches were established or transferred from the year 1999 onwards and became pivotal parishes that helped the development and oversight of the LMS Toefuata'iina Denomination. The Parish Pastors and wives noted were pioneers in the movement and led their consecutive congregations respectively.  We refer to these churches as the Fua o le Sinapi - The sprout of the Sinapi plant, the churches that bloomed from the original seed. 
Blacktown, Sydney	Rev. Tele & Matauaina Tausaga
Auburn, Sydney Rev. Iafeta & Apa’ula Tiuga
Campbelltown, Sydney Rev. Vili & Folose Iosua
Sydney, Sydney Rev. Leafa & Tuatai Fa’asisila
Minto, Sydney	Rev. Fiapoto & Dora Poloai
St Marys, Sydney Rev. Ainu’u & Ualesi Sekai 
Brisbane, Brisbane Rev. Laione & Televine Masefau
Sunnybank, Brisbane Rev. Peletiso & Merenaite Tuivaiti
Henderson, Auckland Rev. Malaefono & Tina Aufai
Kelston, Auckland Rev. Keti & Ema Maiava
Papatoetoe, Auckland Rev. Apolimatai & Fagaua Tautaiolevao
Massey, Auckland Rev. Siutu & Fa’ai’uga Tuivaiti
Avondale, Auckland Faiumu Faletuai (Lay Preacher)
Mangere, Auckland Rev. Fatu & Misili Tagomoa
Blockhouse Bay, Auckland Rev. Lui & Uese Tupa’I
Otahuhu, Auckland Rev. Tuimaseve & Pisila Gasu

It is important to note that more Congregations were established following the 2003 Census (Tusiga Igoa Fono Tele 2003) where the above information was sourced from. Some parishes are not included in this as they were established after the said time.

Controversies

New Zealand case 
Controversy struck the church in its early years. Faleto'ese announced his retirement in 2000, and Rev. Elder Litaea So'oa'emalelagi had won a majority vote at the Fono Tele (General Assembly Meeting) meeting held in Australia for Chairperson (Ta'ita'ifono). However, unbeknown to So'oa'emalelagi, confusion and differences between communications led to Rev. Elder Alapati Tu'uga (Brisbane) being elected and taking on the role as Ta'ita'ifono. So'oa'emalelagi and the Auckland District were enraged with the decision and decided to withdraw the New Zealand District and form an independent body from the main church. So'oa'emalelagi then established the 'Reformed Congregational LMS Samoan Church in New Zealand (LMS Toefuata'iina Samoa New Zealand)' along with the support and membership of all New Zealand LMS Toefuata'iina Churches. 

However, it did not last long. The majority of the Auckland Churches, its members and Pastors formed a view that the Church should be a part of the International Church rather than an Independent Movement. Many expressed the view that they wanted to be a part of a worldwide Christian movement and should reconcile with the church as 'it was the Christian Way'. During the 2001 Tofiga (District Meeting), 10 out of the 12 Parishes in New Zealand at the time voted to return to the L.M.S. Toefuata'iina Church that they had left. Rev. Solomona Iosefa was elected Elder Minister (Toea'ina Fa'atonu) for the New Zealand District and became a pivotal pillar in the expansion of the Church within New Zealand.

So'oa'emalelagi and Siataga (Christchurch) remained an independent church in New Zealand and currently operate as an independent denomination in New Zealand.

Constitution case 
In 2007, a major disruption occurred in the Church that had seen no controversies or disputes since the New Zealand case. Rev. Manusina Taulagi (USA) had been elected as Ta'ita'ifono (Chairperson) that year, succeeding Rev. Alapati Tu'uga's years as Ta'ita'ifono. A comment made by Taulagi regarding the Constitution of the Church caused disagreements between the Fono Tele representatives and subsequently caused a split within the Church between supporters of Taulagi and supporters of Tu'uga. 

Tu'uga decided on a peaceful approach that he and his supporters of 14 Churches would resign and withdraw from the main LMS Toefuata'iina church to form their own denomination. His reasoning was that they fully supported the original Constitution and believed that their collective of churches disagreed with Taulagi's statement 'Ua leai se fa'avae - there is no Constitution'. A peaceful agreement was reached and both Churches decided to end matters on good terms. Tu'uga and his supporters of 14 Churches in Australia and New Zealand formed the 'Pacific LMS Samoan Church - Ekalesia LMS Pasefika Samoa' and now operate as an independent Denomination. Both churches still have a close relationship with one another and work side by side.

Financial case 
Another dispute arose within the churches in 2009 at the Fono Tele (General Assembly Meeting) held in Australia when accusations of financial embezzlement caused a heated argument between the Meeting representatives and Ministers. This argument became physical and caused a ill-feeling with members of the church that they had lost trust in those who were currently holding offices in the church. 

After several deliberations between members and the church officials, Rev. Apolimatai Tautailevao together with Rev. Tele Tausaga, Rev. Lui Tupa'i, Rev. Siutu Tuivaiti and another minister decided to withdraw and resign from the church along with the Parishes that they were currently pastoring at. They formed their own denomination and currently are the legal, formally recognised 'Reformed Congregational LMS Samoan Church' and hold legal jurisdiction to its Constitution and assets.

Taulagi and those who remained subsequently continued the Church to the best of their ability. In 2013, the Church applied to the National Council of Churches in Samoa for membership. However, they were declined based on the notion that they were using the name 'LMS', a legal copyright in Samoa of the EFKS, whom were previously known as the LMS Church. On advice of the National Council of Churches, Taulagi and the Church renamed themselves to the 'First Revival Church of Samoa - Ekalesia Fa'afouina Samoa' abdicating their rights of the Reformed Congregational LMS Samoan Church to Tautaiolevao and their church.

Today
Today, there are only seven churches that remain under the Reformed Congregational LMS Samoan Church denomination. The Church ensued a court case to claim its eligibility and rights to the name of the Church. A Court ruling in Australia deemed this group as the adherents of the original Church founded by Rev. Elder Tepa Faleto'ese. All other denominations using the same name were deemed invalid and unlawful. It is currently headed by Rev. Apolimatai Tautaiolevao as Chairperson (Ta'ita'ifono). Its membership currently stands at 2,000 adherents. 

As of 2015, the memberships are as follows:
Papatoetoe - Rev. Elder Apolimatai & Fagaua Tautaiolevao
Massey - Rev. Elder Siutu & Fa'ai'uga Tuivaiti
Brisbane - Rev. Elder Lui & Uese Tupa'i
Samoa - Vacant
Blockhouse Bay - Vacant

References

Congregationalism in Samoa